Elections to Tameside Council were held on 4 May 2006. One third of the council was up for election, with each successful candidate to serve a four-year term of office, expiring in 2010. The Labour Party retained overall control of the council.

After the election, the composition of the council was as follows:

Results

Ashton Hurst ward

Ashton St. Michael's ward

Ashton Waterloo ward

Audenshaw ward

Denton North East ward

Denton South ward 
Shortly after hearing the result Councillor Arthur Grundy died; he had been suffering from terminal cancer. The seat was retained for Labour a month by Walter Downs later in a by-election.

Denton West ward

Droylsden East ward

Droylsden West ward

Dukinfield ward

Dukinfield / Stalybridge ward

Hyde Godley ward

Hyde Newton ward 
Councillor Margaret Oldham died in office in November 2008. The seat was retained by Philip Fitzpatrick for Labour in a by-election in February 2009.

Hyde Werneth ward

Longdendale ward

Mossley ward

St. Peters ward

Stalybridge North ward

Stalybridge South ward

References

2006 English local elections
2006
2000s in Greater Manchester